Conde de Regla was a 112-gun three-decker ship of the line built at Havanna for the Spanish Navy in 1786 to plans by Romero Landa. One of the eight very large ships of the line of the Santa Ana class, also known as los Meregildos. Conde de Regla served in the Spanish Navy for three decades throughout the French Revolutionary and Napoleonic Wars, finally being sold at Ferrol in 1815. Although she was a formidable part of the Spanish battlefleet throughout these conflicts, the only major action Conde de Regla participated in was the Battle of Cape St Vincent in 1797.

Construction
The Santa Ana class was built for the Spanish fleet in the 1780s and 1790s as heavy ships of the line, the equivalent of Royal Navy first rate ships. The other ships of the class were the Santa Ana, Mejicano, Salvador del Mundo, Real Carlos, San Hermenegildo, Reina María Luisa and Príncipe de Asturias. Three of the class were captured or destroyed during the French Revolutionary Wars.

Conde de Regla was constructed at Havana, funded by Pedro Romero de Terreros, Count of Regla, after whom the ship was named.

History
Conde de Regla's sea-trials took place in 1787 under Juan de Lángara y Huarte, who reported that the ship sailed smoothly and the gun batteries operated efficiently.

In 1797, Conde de Regla was with the Spanish fleet which fought the British at the Battle of Cape St Vincent. The Spanish fleet was defeated and four ships were lost, although Conde de Regla survived the battle with losses of 9 killed, including Commodore Count Amblimont and 16 seriously wounded, including Comandante Jerónimo Bravo.

Between 1799 and 1801, Conde de Regla was with the combined French and Spanish fleet stationed at Brest after participating in the Croisière de Bruix campaign.
During the Napoleonic Wars Conde de Regla was laid up at Arsenal de la Carraca and in 1811 the ship was broken up to provide timber for repairs to the Spanish and British ships based in the port.

References 
 This article is based on a translation of an article from the Spanish Wikipedia.

1786 ships
Ships of the line of the Spanish Navy